Wilko Ltd., formerly Wilkinson Cash Stores (1930–1941) and Wilkinson Hardware Stores (1941–2014), is a British high-street retail chain which sells homewares and household goods. The company was founded in Leicester by James Kemsey Wilkinson in 1930, and remains in the ownership of the founding family.

The founder's son, Tony Wilkinson, joined the company as a branch manager in 1960 and succeeded his father as chairman in 1972, retiring in June 2005. He was succeeded by his daughter, Lisa Wilkinson, and his niece, Karin Swann. In 2014, Karin Swann sold her family's 50% holding in the business to Lisa Wilkinson.

Product range
The Wilko product range concentrates on household essentials, including homewares, textiles, DIY, cleaning products, health and beauty lines, stationery, confectionery, pet products and kitchen and bathroom goods. Wilko sells seasonal lines such as gardening products in the summer, as well as Christmas decorations and an expanded toys and games range from September to January.

The first own-label products sold under the Wilko brand was paint in 1973, and as of 2020 there are over 14,000 own label Wilko products that account for over half of the annual sales.

History

The first Wilkinson store was opened by James Kemsey and his fiancee Mary Cooper at 151 Charnwood Street, Leicester, in 1930, and a second store was opened in Wigston Magna, near Leicester, in 1932. A total of nine branches had been opened by 1939.

The Beaconsfield store can be seen in the background in the film Brief Encounter (1945). By the end of the 1980s, the Wilkinson chain had a total of 78 stores, increasing to over 150 by the time of the founder's death, in 1997.

Wilkinson opened its first Scottish outlet in Castle Douglas in January 2009, in a store formerly occupied by The Co-operative Group. Stores were subsequently opened in Scotland that same year in Motherwell in July, in Irvine in November and in Clydebank in December. In 2010, the stores planned for Scotland to open were Hamilton, Kilmarnock, Greenock and Livingston.

Wilkinson has a trend of taking over redundant former stores rather than building new ones, particularly in the West Midlands; examples have included the former Kwik Save store in Great Bridge (May 2008), the former Safeway store in Halesowen (November 2006) and the former Marks & Spencer store in Dudley (July 1991). The opening of a store in Dudley was an example of a trend of the retailer to take over large units in town centres left vacant by the relocation of big retail names to out of town locations, as Marks & Spencer had closed its Dudley store in 1990, in favour of a new store at the nearby Merry Hill Shopping Centre.

The Dudley store was so successful that a £250,000 expansion to the upper level of the building (initially, only the ground floor was used) was completed three years after its opening. By then, Wilkinson was one of Britain's fastest growing retailers.

In 2012, Wilkinson began rebranding its stores as Wilko, after its own brand products marketed under the Wilko name, and by 2014, most stores had been rebranded.

One side of the Wilkinson family, Karin Swann, sold her 50 percent share of the business to the other side of the family in 2014, leaving Tony Wilkinson, his wife Christine and Lisa Wilkinson the sole owners of the company and Lisa Wilkinson the sole chairman. Swann wanted to pursue other business interests and the decision did not represent a falling-out of the family.

In August 2017, Wilko began negotiations with GMB over their plan to remove over 4,000 positions. This was contrasted unfavourably with reports that Lisa Wilkinson had just received a £3m dividend.

In March 2018, Wilko began to sell 285 of its own brand products in Dubai through ACE stores, marking the first time that Wilko has sold through another retailer.

In June 2020, Warpaint London, a colour cosmetics company, signed a deal with Wilko to sell those items in UK shops.

In January 2022, Wilko announced the closure of 15 stores with more expensive long leases.

Warehouses and distribution
The company's first warehouse and offices opened in 1938 in existing premises in Syston, Charnwood. Wilko's first purpose-built warehouse on Brighton Road, Leicester, opened in 1937. In 1970, the head office and warehouse were relocated to Carlton-in-Lindrick, Nottinghamshire, and a 'high-bay' stacking system was installed. Wilko's current main distribution centre (DC1) opened in 1995 and is located in Manton Wood, Worksop, Nottinghamshire. At the time of opening, it had the fastest sorting system in the UK. A second distribution centre (DC2) was opened in Magor, south Wales in 2000. 

The company awarded a five-year logistics contract to Wincanton plc in March 2017, replacing Canute Haulage Group after 29 years. In September 2019, the GMB union announced that its members would strike over a new weekend working proposal at the distribution centres. The strikes planned for four dates in October 2019 were called off after an improved offer was made by Wilko.

Marketing and brand
Advertising is concentrated in the press, such as inserts included with local newspapers. There are also occasional radio and TV campaigns. Advertising emphasises value for money, with in-store promotion encouraging customers to purchase more than one item when they visit the store. In recent years Wilko's social media presence has also shown significant growth with a combined following of 250k followers. 

A revamped version of the brand was unveiled in December 2008. Designed by Jupiter Creative, the brand was showcased in new format stores in Thornaby, Northallerton (which replaced a former Woolworths store), Sheffield, Leicester, Newton Aycliffe and Walton-on-Thames as well as the Castle Douglas, Motherwell and Clydebank stores in Scotland.

Financial performance
Turnover for the year ending February 2022 was in excess of £1.2 billion.

References

External links

British companies established in 1930
Retail companies established in 1930
1930 establishments in the United Kingdom
Companies based in Nottinghamshire
Home improvement companies of the United Kingdom
Retail companies of the United Kingdom
Discount shops of the United Kingdom